Charles Peter "Pete" Couch (August 16, 1890 – June 5, 1955) succeeded his brother Harvey C. Couch as president of Kansas City Southern Railway on August 11, 1939.

Biography 
Pete Couch was born in Calhoun, a tiny community in south Arkansas' Columbia County. One of six children of Tom and Mamie Heard Couch, he was initially raised on a small cotton farm. His father was also an itinerant Methodist minister. When Pete was around age 3, his father's health deteriorated, and the family moved to nearby Magnolia, the seat of Columbia County. 

Pete Couch led a crew that raised utility poles for Harvey Couch's new telephone lines in northern Louisiana. Years later, Pete Couch was president of the Louisiana and Arkansas Railway, prior to becoming Kansas City Southern president.

References

1890 births
1955 deaths
20th-century American railroad executives
Kansas City Southern Railway

20th-century American businesspeople